In Christianity, the apostle Paul introduced the concept of the spiritual body in the New Testament (1 Corinthians 15:44), describing the resurrected body as "spiritual" in contrast to the natural body:

Christian teaching traditionally interprets Paul as comparing a resurrected body with a mortal body, saying that it will be a different kind of body; a "spiritual body", meaning an immortal body, or incorruptible body (15:53—54). In the Catholic Church, traditionally the resurrected body is called the "glorified body", and possessed four characteristics: incorruptibility, subtlety, impassibility, and agility. The bodies of the damned are also raised incorrupt, but not glorified or free from suffering.

See also

Body of light
Body of resurrection

References

New Testament theology
New Testament words and phrases
Resurrection